Governor Rennie may refer to:

George Rennie (sculptor and politician) (1802–1860), Governor of the Falkland Islands from 1848 to 1855
Gilbert Rennie (1895–1981), Governor of Northern Rhodesia from 1948 to 1954
John Shaw Rennie (1917–2002), Governor of Vanuatu from 1955 to 1962 and Governor of Mauritius from 1962 to 1968